Richard Owen Abel (born 1941) is a professor of Comparative Literature in the University of Michigan, United States. He has presented several anthologies of French texts translated in English including Colette's first review about The Cheat, Louis Delluc's critics, and Marcel L'Herbier's manifesto. 
He won the Theatre Library Association Award in 1985, 1995 and 2006.

Bibliography
Abel, Richard The Red Rooster Scare: Making Cinema American, 1900-1910 University of California Press, 1999
Abel, Richard, ed.  French Film Theory and Criticism.  Two volumes.  Princeton:  Princeton UP, 1988.
Abel, Richard, ed.  French Cinema: The First Wave, 1915-1929  Princeton:  Princeton UP, 1984.

References

1941 births
Living people
French film critics
University of Michigan faculty
French male non-fiction writers